Joachim Linnemann (born 17 April 1951) is a former West German basketball player. He competed in the men's tournament at the 1972 Summer Olympics.

References

External links
 

1951 births
Living people
German men's basketball players
Olympic basketball players of West Germany
Basketball players at the 1972 Summer Olympics
Sportspeople from Frankfurt
USC Heidelberg players